National Nuclear Energy Day is observed on 9 April (Farvardin 20th) in Iran. The observation marks the '9 April 2006' when Iran announced it had successfully domesticated the complete cycle of Uranium enrichment despite the sanctions.

Background
In 2003, Iran opposition groups efforts in Western media towards accusing Iran of building a nuclear weapon made Europe and the United States sensitive. These countries tried to halt the Iranian nuclear activities under various pretexts, but on 9 April 2006, Iran was able to complete the full cycle of nuclear fuel production.

Holiday observation 
In 2010, as part of a ceremony in honor of the holiday, the first sample of the latest Iranian-made nuclear fuel and a model of a third generation centrifuge for enriching uranium   were presented.

See also 

 Assassination of Iranian nuclear scientists

References

National days in Iran
Nuclear technology in Iran